The year 545 BC was a year of the pre-Julian Roman calendar. In the Roman Empire, it was known as year 209  Ab urbe condita. The denomination 545 BC for this year has been used since the early medieval period, when the Anno Domini calendar era became the prevalent method in Europe for naming years. 

In the Buddhist calendar, it corresponds to the year 0, traditionally the year when the Buddha reached parinirvana. However, different traditions disagree about the actual year 0, with many placing it in the following year 544 BC instead.

Births

Deaths
 King Kang of Chu, King of the State of Chu
 Zhou ling wang, King of the Zhou Dynasty of China.

References